In complex analysis, a mathematical discipline, the fundamental normality test gives sufficient conditions to test the normality of a family of analytic functions. It is another name for the stronger version of Montel's theorem.

Statement
Let  be a family of analytic functions defined on a domain .

The proof relies on properties of the elliptic modular function and can be found here:

See also
Montel's theorem

Complex analysis